Berdychi is a village (a selo) in the Pokrovsk Raion (district) of Donetsk Oblast in eastern Ukraine. 

Until 18 July 2020, Berdychi belonged to Yasynuvata Raion. The raion was abolished that day as part of the administrative reform of Ukraine, which reduced the number of raions of Donetsk Oblast to eight, of which only five were controlled by the government. The government-controlled area of Yasynuvata Raion was merged into Pokrovsk Raion.

Demographics
Native language as of the Ukrainian Census of 2001:
 Ukrainian 11.24%
 Russian 88.39%

Notable people
Oleksandr Lukyanchenko (born 1947), politician, Mayor of Donetsk

References

Villages in Pokrovsk Raion